Bigg Boss 6 was the sixth season of the Tamil version of the Indian reality television series Bigg Boss based on the Dutch series Big Brother and produced by Endemol Shine India (now merged with Banijay). The show launched on 9 October 2022 on Star Vijay along with a 24/7 Live stream on Disney+ Hotstar. Kamal Haasan has officially once again been appointed as the host for the sixth time.

The season's grand finale took place on 22 January 2023 and Mohammed Azeem was announced as the winner whereas Vikraman Radhakrishnan became the runner up.

Shivin Ganesan made history in the Bigg Boss franchise by emerging as the first transwomen finalist in history of the show and first transgender contestant to reach the finale.

Production

Eye logo 
The eye logo was officially released on 3 September 2022. The logo of the season was shaped in an oval kind of manner with a full gold and brownish brush. However a round red circle in the middle of the eye symbolizes heated arguments and a tough challenge to take place in the season.

House 
The House of this season had a "'Luxurious Mansion'" theme. The house was once again located in EVP Film City, Chennai for the seventh time, including Bigg Boss Ultimate (season 1) which was also located in EVP.

Teaser 
The show organizers officially released the teaser on 5 September 2022 once again featuring actor Kamal Haasan as the host for the sixth time. The 2nd teaser was officially released on 10 September 2022. The third teaser was released on 27 September 2022, officially revealing the launch date of the season which was titled as the Grand Launch Night which launched on 9 October 2022.

Broadcast
On 30 September 2022, The makers of the show announced the show stands out for the fact that it will stream 24x7 live on Disney+ Hotstar and an hour-long episode every day on Star Vijay. The episodes will be first telecasted through 24 Hours Live Channel on a paid subscription to Disney+ Hotstar for only members who are subscribed and have a membership with Disney+ Hotstar. The 24 hour stream is not available on Saturday and Sunday due to weekend special episodes.
The show will telecast live in Disney+ Hotstar. The one-hour episode will be telecast in Star Vijay Television. The Unseen Episode will be telecast in Vijay Takkar.

Housemate status

Housemates
The participants in the order of appearance and entered in house are:

Original entrants

Celebrities
 G. Pechimuthu (G. P. Muthu) – Social media influencer and carpenter from Tuticorin district, Tamil Nadu.
 Asal Kolaar – Rapper known for his song Jorthaale and special collaboration music with rapper and songwriter OfRo.
 Mohammed Azeem – Television actor known for playing the lead role in the TV serials Pagal Nilavu,  Kadaikutty Singam and Poove Unakkaga.
 Robert – Choreographer and actor. He has performed as a dancer in movies and has acted in a couple of films as well.
 Ayesha Zeenath – Television actress known for playing the titular role of Sathya in the TV serial Sathya as well as its sequel Sathya 2.
 Sheriina – Actress and Supermodel who is known for her role in the film Vinodhaya Sitham (2021).
 Manikandan Rajesh – Television actor. He is known for his appearance in the dating reality show Mr And Mrs Chinnathirai (season 3) which aired on Star Vijay in 2019, as well as the TV serials Sondha Bandham, Azhagu and Akka  . He is the elder brother of film actress Aishwarya Rajesh.
 Rachitha Mahalakshmi – Television actress known for playing the lead role the TV serials Saravanan Meenatchi, Naam Iruvar Namakku Iruvar (season 2), Idhu Solla Marandha Kadhai and Ilavarasi.
 Ram Ramaswamy – Actor, Model.
Aaryan Dinesh Kanagaratnam (ADK) – Sri Lankan Tamil rapper and record producer. He has worked in the Tamil and Telugu music industries as well and is known for his collaboration with A. R. Rahman.
 Janany Kunaseelan – Sri Lankan Tamil television anchor and actress. She appeared in Star Tamil TV as a television anchor for cooking shows and as an actress for comedy shows like Dak Dik Dos on IBC Tamil.
 Shanthi Arvind – Choreographer and television actress. She is known for her dance performance in the Tamil TV serial Metti Oli which aired from 2002 to 2005. She has also acted in TV serials such as Kula Deivam, Kannana Kanne, and Muthuzhagu.
 Vikraman Radhakrishnan – Journalist, politician and television actor who is the official spokesperson of the Viduthalai Chiruthaigal Katchi (VCK) party and He is known for playing the lead role in the serial  Vinnaithaandi Varuvaayaa. 
 Amudhavanan – Comedian and actor. He is known for appearing in many stage shows and comedy reality shows on Star Vijay. He also appeared in films such as Tharai Thappattai (2016), Julieum 4 Perum (2017) and Billa Pandi (2018).
 Maheshwari Chanakyan – Actress and video jockey. Known for her role in her debut serial Puthu Kavithai (2013). She is also known for appearing in films such as Chennai 600028 II (2018), Writer (2021) and Vikram (2022).
 Kathirravan Kabilan – Video jockey and actor. Known for hosting numerous talk shows on Sun Music and Sun TV including Vanakkam Tamizha
 Queency Stanly – Television actress known for acting in the TV serial Anbe Vaa.
 Nivaashiyni Saravanan – Model, social media influencer and television actress from Singapore. She is known for appearing in a couple of television shows on Vasantham such as Vettai: Pledged to Hunt.

General public (commoners)
 Dhanalakshmi – TikTok candidate from Bhavani, Erode.
 Shivin Ganesan – IT expert from Karaikudi.

Wildcard Entrant

 Myna Nandhini – Television actress and anchor. She is known for featuring in the serial Saravanan Meenatchi and movies such as Aranmanai 3 (2021) and Vikram (2022).

Twists

Banana Bed punishment
The Banana Bed is a punishment that housemates faced upon their arrival into the house on the grand launch day. The four housemates who are being nominated as the least interactive housemate they will be forced to sleep in the banana bed as a punishment. The housemates who have the majority votes will be forced to face the punishment. These four housemates were also directly nominated for Week 2 eviction process. If housemates who are under the banana bed punishment and excel in tasks, they will be removed from the eviction list and be replaced by another co housemate of their choice.

BB Club House
On Day 2, each housemate was put into clubs (groups). Each club were Vessels, Cleaning, Kitchen and Bathroom clubs. Each clubs need to complete the chores based on their group rules.

Finale Week 
For the first time in the history of Bigg Boss Tamil, Cash Prizes were offered twice in the name of Cash Bag & Cash Box, On day 100 Kathiravan walked with the Cash Bag (₹3 Lakhs) & on day 103 Amudhavanan walked with  the Cash Box (₹11.75 Lakhs) . On day 103, Myna Nandhini was evicted during mid-week eviction process. Instead of the usual four to five finalists followed in the previous seasons, this season had only 3 Finalists on Day 105 replicating the original Big Brother format.

Jail Punishment

Special episodes

Guest appearance

Weekly summary

Nomination Table 

  indicates Celebrity contestant
  indicates Commoner contestant
  indicates the House Captain
  indicates the Nominees for House Captaincy
  indicates that the Housemate was directly nominated for eviction prior to the regular nominations process
  indicates that the housemate went to secret room
  indicates that the Housemate was granted immunity from nominations
  indicates the contestant has been sent to the Bigg Boss Jail as a punishment
  indicates the winner
  indicates the first runner up
  indicates the second runner up
  indicates the third runner up
  indicates the contestant has been walked out of the show
  indicates the contestant has been evicted

Notes 

 : Janany, Nivaashini, Queency and Vikraman were nominated as the 4 least interactive housemates on Launch Day, hence they are also directly nominated for Week 2 nomination process against public vote.
 : Each club member had the power to swap a nominated housemate with a safe housemate on Day 3, Janany, Nivaashiyni and Queency were all swapped and became safe while Vikraman remained in the nomination list. After the swap Ayesha, Azeem, Ram and Vikraman were nominated for week 2 eviction.
 : On day 4, Each club member had the power to make their finalized swap and make any changes to the nomination list. After the finalized swap Azeem, Dhanalakshmi, Maheshwari and Ram nominated for week 2 eviction. Ayesha and Vikraman was swapped and became safe.
 : On Day 7, Nandhini entered the house as a wildcard contestant. She was thus immune from the Week 2 nomination process.
 : Amudhavanan, Dhanalakshmi, Kathirravan, Nandhini, Nivaashiyni, Manikandan, Robert and Shivin entered nomination free zone in week 3 after successfully accomplishing a task in week 2. therefore they are saved from week 3 nomination process.
 : Janany and Ram were sent to the Bigg Boss jail in week 2 as a punishment after being ranked in the bottom 2 category by the co housemates.
 : GP Muthu wanted to see his son who was sick so he walked out from BiggBoss on Day 13.
 : Since Shanthi was evicted on Day 14 (week 2) she was scrapped from the captaincy nomination. On suggestion from BiggBoss, she named Queency as her replacement.
 : Queency won the week 3 captaincy task and was the second captain for the Bigg Boss house.
 : Azeem and Shivin were sent to the Bigg Boss jail in week 3 as a punishment after being selected by all the housemates as the worst performers of the week.
 : During NEEYUM BOMMAI NAANUM BOMMAI task, Amudhavanan, Ram and Robert manage to secure their dolls without getting eliminated, hence they were granted the power to avoid getting nominated for Week 4 nomination process.
 : Amudhavanan and Manikandan where selected as best performers of the week and were saved from nomination. Dhanalakshmi's team won the Sweet Factory task and as a leader she was saved from nomination, however she got the option to select the best player in her team and she selected Rachitha. Hence Rachitha is also saved from nomination. And all four of them were selected for captaincy task.
 : Dhanalakshmi was removed from captaincy task, instead it was given to Vikraman due to fair play in Sweet Factory task and Dhanalakshmi's team was disqualified by the Host.
 : During BOGABIZZAVUM ALIENGALUM task, Dhanalakshmi and Rachitha had a lot of stone from their team respectively and were saved from Week 9 Nominations.
 : There is a double eviction in 9th week. Ram was evicted on Day 62 and Ayesha was evicted on Day 63.
 : During SHORTCUT task, Adk, Amudhavanan, Janany and Manikandan managed to secure their position as angels, hence they were granted the power to avoid getting nominated for Week 11 nomination process, except Janany was evicted on Day 70.
 : In Week 13 Ticket to finale task commenced.
 : Since Amudhavanan won the ticket to finale task he was immediately removed from Week 13 nomination list and making him the 1st finalist of the season.
 : All housemates besides Amudhavanan (finalist) was nominated for eviction process since it was the semi final week.
 : ADK was the final housemate evicted by facing public vote for the season.
 : On Day 100, Kathirravan accepted the cash prize eviction and left the Bigg Boss house.
 : On Day 103, Amudhavanan accepted the cash prize eviction and left the Bigg Boss house.
 : Azeem, Nandhini, Shivin and Vikraman became the top 4 finalist of the season
 : On Day 103, Nandhini was evicted during mid-week eviction thus she became the 3rd Runner-Up.

Nominations faced
In the order of total number of nominations faced:-

References

External links 
 Official Website at Hotstar

Tamil 6
2022 Tamil-language television seasons
Kamal Haasan
Star Vijay original programming
Tamil-language television shows
2023 Tamil-language television series endings